is a Japanese manga series written and illustrated by Hiroshi Shiibashi, serialized in Weekly Shōnen Jump from March to November 2019. The individual chapters were collected and published by Shueisha into four tankōbon volumes. Viz Media and Shueisha simulpublished the series in English on their services Shonen Jump digital platform and Manga Plus respectively.

Publication
Written and illustrated by Hiroshi Shiibashi, Yui Kamio Lets Loose was serialized in Shueisha's shōnen manga magazine Weekly Shōnen Jump from March 11 to November 25, 2019. Shueisha collected its 36 chapters in four tankōbon volumes, released from July 4, 2019, to February 4, 2020.

Viz Media and Shueisha simulpublished the series in English on their respective services Shonen Jump digital platform and the app and website Manga Plus. Viz Media announced the digital release of the manga for early 2020. The volumes were released from February 25 to August 25, 2020.

Volume list

References

External links
Official manga website 

2019 manga
Comedy anime and manga
Shōnen manga
Shueisha manga
Supernatural anime and manga
Viz Media manga